Newark Assembly was a Chrysler (DaimlerChrysler from 1998-2008) factory in Newark, Delaware built in 1951 to make tanks and later automobiles with production continuing until December 2008.

A variety of Chrysler, Dodge, and Plymouth models were produced at this facility over the years, totaling nearly 7 million cars.

History
Chrysler bought the facility in 1938 to use as a parts depot. 

Construction began in January 1951 for a plant to produce tanks with the first M48 Patton driven to Army Ordnance on April 11, 1952. 11,703 M48s were built at the plant between opening and 1959. A five-year phase-out after the Korean War brought the facility and tank production to an end by 1961. The plant also produced M103 heavy tanks. 

The facility was used for the production of Plymouth and Dodge automobiles starting in 1957. By 1961, construction began on a 1.5 million square foot Plymouth plant where the Chrysler A platform was used to build Dodge and Plymouth compacts.

During the 1990s, a recycling initiative was implemented to reduce the factory's environmental impact as well as to improve the facility's reputation. This was the result of several fires and air pollution from the plant, for which the Environmental Protection Agency fined the automaker.

To prepare the Newark plant for the production of the 1997 Dodge Durango, a sport utility vehicle (SUV) the company invested US$623 million that included a new training facility, production simulation building, a paint shop, as well as upgrades to the  test track, a new material handling fleet, and new controls on the assembly line.

On February 14, 2007, DaimlerChrysler announced that the plant would lose one working shift in 2007 and that it would be scheduled to be shut down completely in 2009.

In October 2008, the company announced that the closure would be moved up to the end of 2008 citing a slowdown in both the economy and demand for large vehicles. Production ended and the neighboring Mopar parts distribution center was also closed in 2008.

On October 24, 2009, The University of Delaware announced it had signed a deal to buy the  Chrysler facility for US$24.25 million. The property is next to the university's south campus (the main campus is a 1/4-mile north and usually accessible by bus by students). Plans are to use it as a research and development site and for the future expansion of the university.

The history department at the University of Delaware and the Hugh M. Morris Library used a class of graduate and undergraduate students to conduct interviews of eleven former autoworkers employed at the Newark Assembly plant.

The University has decommissioned the buildings with approximately 90% of the material on the site recycled.

The location was developed then for the Science, Technology, and Advanced Research (STAR) campus. In 2012, Bloom Energy, makers of the Bloom Energy Server held a groundbreaking for a new manufacturing plant at the former auto assembly site. In 2014, the first tenant of a revitalized Chrysler building will be the College of Health Sciences and a health-related complex.

On November 19, 2015, the Digital Infrastructure Management company SevOne announced its move to the STAR Campus

Products

1948-1959 M48 Patton tank
1959–1960 M60 Patton tank, the Tank Plant closed in 1961
1960–1964 Dodge Dart, Dodge Lancer, Plymouth Valiant
1964–1971 Chrysler
1974–1975 Dodge Dart, Plymouth Valiant
1976–1980 Dodge Aspen, Plymouth Volare
1977–1980 Chrysler LeBaron, Dodge Diplomat
1981–1988 Dodge Aries, Plymouth Reliant (sedan and station wagon)
1982–1988 Chrysler Town and Country Wagon
1982–1995 Chrysler LeBaron (sedan from 1982 to 1988)
1989–1995 Dodge Spirit, Plymouth Acclaim
1992–1995 Chrysler LeBaron (coupe and convertible) 
1994–1996 Chrysler Concorde, Dodge Intrepid
1998–2009 Dodge Durango
2007–2009 Chrysler Aspen

Notes:

See also
 List of former automotive manufacturing plants

References

External links

Chrysler factories
Former motor vehicle assembly plants
Motor vehicle assembly plants in Delaware
Buildings and structures in Newark, Delaware
Industrial buildings completed in 1951
1951 establishments in Delaware
2008 disestablishments in Delaware